François Simon (16 August 1917 – 5 October 1982) was a Swiss stage and film actor. He appeared in more than 30 films between 1936 and 1982. He was the son of actor Michel Simon.

Filmography

External links

1917 births
1982 deaths
Swiss male film actors
Actors from Geneva
20th-century Swiss male actors